Resurrection: The J.R. Richard Story is a 2005 American independent film, directed by Greg Carter and Benjamin O. Jimerson-Phillips, Executive Producers Charlie Bellinger, J.R. Richard & Larry Johnson; and Produced by Benjamin O. Jimerson-Phillips, and Bruce Dalton, starring David Ramsey and Charles Durning two time Academy Award Nominee. The film is a biopic tale of the Houston Astros baseball Pitcher J. R. Richard, his life high points and struggles. It was shot by Bellinger-7 Films, which is owned by Ms. Charlie Bellinger-Bethea, former wife of Pro Football Hall of Fame inductee Elvin Bethea, and done in association with Nexus Films & Adept Films Inc.

Premise
The story of famed Houston Astros baseball Pitcher J.R. Richard, from his early life in Louisiana, to his beginnings as a major baseball player in 1969, leading up to the massive stroke he suffered in 1980, leaving his only true Resurrection to his close friends and fans back into baseball.

Cast
 David Ramsey as J.R. Richard
 Charles Durning as Frank McNally
 Kenya Moore as Leticia 
 Sara Stokes as Pamela 
 Ron Finberg as Wally Cruise 
 Annette P. Jimerson as Secretary 
 Jessica M. Jimerson as Jessy

References

External links 
 
 Resurrection: The J.R. Richard Story at Yahoo! Movies

2005 films
2000s biographical films
2005 independent films
2000s sports films
Films set in Houston
Films shot in Houston
American baseball films
American independent films
American biographical films
2000s English-language films
2000s American films